Ernestina Ascención Rosario (1934 – 6 February 2007) was indigenous Nahua native to the mountains of Zongolica, Veracruz, Mexico. Her death at 73 years of age caused uproar across Mexico as a result of the accusations that she had been raped and murdered by several Mexican soldiers, but these allegations could not be officially substantiated.  Authorities later determined her death to be of natural causes, without criminal implications. This version has not convinced the family or human rights advocacy groups.

Case description

Ernestina Ascención Rosario died while herding sheep in Tetlatzinga community. She was found, lying on the grass, still alive, and allegedly managed to say that she had been assaulted by soldiers. The first autopsy confirmed that she had been the victim of rape.

The social outrage in Soledad Atzompa, Veracruz, was such that the detachment of soldiers assigned to the area were forced to withdraw. Previously, the behavior of these soldiers had been the subject of written complaints to the local authority, but no action had been taken. The National Defense Secretariat denied any connection to the death of Rosario, whose death was blamed on natural causes. This version of events was also defended President Felipe Calderón.

The controversy reached the municipal, state and federal level (including President Calderón), to the highest echelons of the military, the opposition political parties and the National Human Rights Commission.

Conflicting accounts of the events have continued to be the subject of disagreement.  While some maintain that she died at the hands of the soldiers stationed nearby, others say she died due to complications from an ulcer. The first was initially defended by the government of Veracruz, the second by the Presidency of the Republic and then by the National Human Rights Commission.

Her death and the subsequent confusion over its cause reflect different problems in Mexican political and social life, such as indigenous rights, women's rights, poverty, democracy, the role of the military in peacetime, and the objectivity of the media amongst others.

Chronology of events

2007
 26 February. Ernestina Ascención is found dying by her daughter, on a plain 100 meters from a military base in Zongolica, Veracruz.
 6 March 6. The National Defense Secretariat (SEDENA) issued a statement that came to cause confusion, as it admitted that there had been a "crime", but accused "groups" opposed to the government.  It stated "It is clear that this groups disaffected by this institution, have repeatedly questioned the actions taken on behalf of Mexican society, and in this particular case criminals who used military uniforms perpetrated the crime, looking for blame to members of the federal executive agency and to leave the area to thereby continue their activities."
 13 March. Before the end of the investigation of the Office of Veracruz, the Department of National Defense and the National Human Rights Commission, President Calderón said in an interview with La Jornada that Mrs. Ascencio died of "chronic gastritis".
 28 March. PAN deputy, retired Gen. Jorge González, showed reporters in the Chamber of Deputies a CNDH document which already anticipated clinical causes of death of Ernestina Ascencio, discarding the rape allegation.
 6 April.  The manager of Social Communication of the Army, Brigadier General Mario Lucio González Cortés, sent a letter to the newspaper La Jornada, noting that "The Ministry of Defense has not shown any of the seminal fluid supposedly found in the body of Mrs. Ernestina Ascencio Rosario, and never has had. "
 24 April. The governor of Veracruz, Fidel Herrera, meets with the President of the CNDH.
 30 April.  The case is closed by special prosecutor of Veracruz. The justice of the investigation, Juan Alatriste, partially gave reason to the CNDH, in concluding that the 73-year-old "was not raped," but died of "parasitosis".

2010
 15 March. The State Attorney General (Procuraduría General de Justicia del Estado, or PGJE) bars the findings of coroner Dr. Juan Pablo Mendizábal Pérez, responsible for performing the autopsy on the body of the Rosario three years after her death. The barring officially issued by the Deputy of Monitoring and Control of the PGJE was the result of the process of claiming that the physician responsible for contaminating blood samples had erroneously certified the existence of a crime by claiming rape, having performed the autopsy in an unauthorized place and having done so in the presence of unauthorized persons. "In an interview on the radio and TV for MVS Radio conducted by Carmen Aristegui, Dr. Mendizábal Pérez defended his position that Ernestina's body was found with a significant amount of sperm in the vagina and rectum which tested positive for prostatic proteins and Y chromosome. Additionally, the doctor defended his initial description of the injuries, reiterating the presence of rectal and vaginal tears indicating nonconsensual penetration.  During the interview the doctor said that the autopsy was conducted at a private funeral home, due to the lack of a legal jurisdiction, a situation that occurs far. The doctor also said that this case highlights the involvement of different levels Mexican government — from municipal to federal — in the silencing of the case in order to protect the image of the army, whose staff seem to be primarily responsible for the violation of indigenous rights. During the interview, the doctor contended that the evidence that Rosario was raped is incontrovertible, and the fact that it was denied is possibly "the greatest fraud" by Dr. José Luis Soberanes who then presided over the National Human Rights Commission (from MVS radio broadcast of Carmen Aristegui dated 17 March 2010).

Media impact
The case of Ernestina Ascención Rosario had national impact and related to other abuses of authority, as the events of police repression in Atenco or the Oaxaca teachers' conflict, in which several women were assaulted by state and federal police.

The National Commission on Human Rights, led by Dr. José Luis Soberanes, acted for the perpetrators and was called before the federal deputies responsible for making recommendations to the agencies involved in the case, including SEDENA.

Case closure
The Attorney General of the State of Veracruz began an investigation into the case, which ended on 1 May 2007. Having determined that Rosario's death was a natural death "by parasitosis", no criminal action was appropriate.

References

External links
 Chronology of events as www.elgabinete.org

Nahua people
Murder in Mexico
Rape in Mexico
People from Veracruz
1934 births
2007 deaths
Indigenous Mexican women
Femicide in Mexico